Ali El-Hassani (January 1897 – 1976) was an Egyptian footballer. He competed at the 1920 Summer Olympics, 1924 Summer Olympics and the 1928 Summer Olympics.

Honours and achievements

Club
Zamalek
Sultan Hussein Cup: 1920–21,1921–22
Cairo League: 1922–1923,1929–30,1931–32
Egypt Cup: 1922
Al Ahly
Egypt Cup: 1924–25,1925–26,1926–27,1929–30,1930–31
Cairo League: 1924–25,1926–27,1930–31
Sultan Hussein Cup: 1924–25,1925–26,1926–27,1930–31
El Sekka El Hadid
Sultan Hussein Cup: 1935–36

References

External links
 

1897 births
1976 deaths
Egyptian footballers
Egypt international footballers
Olympic footballers of Egypt
Footballers at the 1920 Summer Olympics
Footballers at the 1924 Summer Olympics
Footballers at the 1928 Summer Olympics
Footballers from Cairo
Association football midfielders